The SIG GL 5040/5140 is a 40 mm grenade launcher, which can be mounted under all SIG SG 550/551 assault rifle models and is operated in single-shot mode.
For compact SG 552/553, the smaller GL 5340 grenade launcher can be used.

Users
: The Swiss military in-service designation for the GL 5040 is 40 mm Gewehraufsatz 97.
: Used by Malaysian Coast Guard.

References

External links

40 mm Grenade Launcher GL 5040 and GL 5140 at Swiss Arms company website
Swiss Arms GL 5040/5140 40 mm grenade launcher (Switzerland), Weapon accessories at Jane's
Swiss Arms Law Enforcement and Defense Products Catalog

40×46mm grenade launchers
Weapons of Switzerland
SIG Sauer firearms